In Australia and New Zealand, an energy rating label or energy rating is a label affixed to various appliances prior to retail sale, which allows consumers to compare the energy efficiency of product and allows consumers to know how much power a particular model will use to run. They allow consumers to compare the energy consumption of similar products, and factor lifetime running cost into their purchasing decision. The energy rating label is a mandatory comparison label under Australian regulations for store sales but not for products sold online. The label comprises an energy consumption figure for the appliance and a star rating. The energy consumption figure is an estimate of how much energy (in kilowatt-hours or kWh) the appliance will use over a year, based on assumptions about “average usage”.

However, actual energy consumption will depend on how an appliance is used and how often it is used. Factors like climate can also influence energy consumption (and efficiency) for some appliances.

The energy rating label usually incorporates an energy star label, which is an endorsement label that is not regulated by the Australian Government. It is an international standard for energy efficient consumer products that originated in the United States. Appliances and equipment that qualify to carry the energy star mark are generally in the top 25% most energy efficient products. In Australia, the label is used for office equipment and home electronics. New Zealand uses the energy star label for a much wider range of products such as whitegoods, lighting, heating, water heating and windows.

History
The label was introduced in 1986 in the Australian states of New South Wales and Victoria and later its use was extended to all states and territories. A mandatory, national labelling scheme was agreed to in 1992. Australia was the third country to establish such a system, after Canada and the United States.

An International Energy Agency survey revealed that compliance by retailers showing the labels was raised from 94% in 2001 to 98% in 2009.

See also

Energy input labeling
Energy policy in Australia
Electricity sector in New Zealand
European Union energy label
House Energy Rating
WELS rating

References 

 http://www.energyrating.gov.au/about/what-we-do/labelling This article contains quotations from this source, which is available under a Creative Commons Attribution 3.0 Australia licence
 https://web.archive.org/web/20110601175054/http://www.energyrating.gov.au/history.html Commonwealth of Australia. 2 February 2009. Archived from the original on 1 June 2011. Retrieved 11 June 2011.
 http://bigpondnews.com/articles/National/2010/10/12/Energy_rating_labels_succes_524831.html. Bigpond News. 13 October 2010. Retrieved 11 June 2011.

External links
Energy labelling at the Australian Department of Climate Change and Energy Efficiency
Energy rating labels at the New Zealand Energy Efficiency and Conservation Authority
Energy rating labels at EECA Energywise

Energy conservation
Energy in Australia
Energy in New Zealand
Environment of Australia
Environment of New Zealand
Ecolabelling
1986 introductions